Milano Centrale is the main railway station of the city of Milan, Italy, and is the largest railway station in Europe by volume. The station is a terminus and located at the northern end of central Milan. It was officially inaugurated in 1931 to replace the old central station (built 1864), which was a transit station but with a limited number of tracks and space, so could not handle the increased traffic caused by the opening of the Simplon Tunnel in 1906.

Milano Centrale has high-speed connections to Turin in the west, Venice via Verona in the east and on the north–south mainline to Bologna, Rome, Naples and Salerno. The Simplon and Gotthard railway lines connect Milano Centrale to Basel and Geneva via Domodossola and Zürich via Chiasso in Switzerland.

Destinations of inter-city and regional railways radiate from Milano Centrale to Ventimiglia (border of France), Genova, Turin, Domodossola (border of Swiss Canton of Valais/Wallis), Tirano (border of Swiss Canton of Graubünden/Grisons), Bergamo, Verona, Mantova, Bologna and La Spezia.

The Milan suburban railway service, however, does not use Milano Centrale but the other mainline stations: Porta Garibaldi (northwest), Cadorna (west) and Rogoredo (east).

Aldo Rossi declared in an interview of February 1995 to Cecilia Bolognesi: "They told me that when Frank Lloyd Wright came to Milan, and he came only once, he was really impressed by it and said it was the most beautiful station in the world. For me it is also more beautiful than Grand Central Station in New York. I know few stations like this one".

History
The first Milano Centrale station opened in 1864 in the area now occupied by the Piazza della Repubblica, south of the modern station. It was designed by French architect Louis-Jules Bouchot (1817–1907) and its architectural style was reminiscent of Parisian buildings of that period. The station was designed to replace Porta Tosa station (opened in 1846 as the terminus of the line to Treviglio and eventually Venice) and Porta Nuova station (opened in 1850 as the second terminus on the line to Monza, which was eventually extended to Chiasso) and was interconnected with all lines, either existing or under construction, surrounding Milan. It remained in operation until 30 June 1931, when the current station was opened. There is now no trace of the old station left.

King Victor Emmanuel III of Italy laid the cornerstone of the new station on 28 April 1906, before a blueprint for the station had even been chosen. The last, real, contest for its construction was won in 1912 by architect Ulisse Stacchini, whose design was modeled after Washington Union Station in Washington, DC, and the construction of the new station began. The purported style was an eclectic mix called "Assyrian-Lombard."

Due to the Italian economic crisis during World War I, construction proceeded very slowly, and the project, rather simple at the beginning, kept changing and became more and more complex and majestic. This happened especially when Benito Mussolini became Prime Minister, and wanted the station to represent the power of the Fascist regime.

Construction resumed in 1925, and on 1 July 1931 the station was officially opened in the presence of Foreign Minister Galeazzo Ciano.

The station played a vital role during the Holocaust in Italy, when Jewish inmates from the San Vittore Prison, previously captured in northern Italy, would be taken to a secret track, Binario 21, underneath the station to be deported to extermination camps. Altogether, 15 deportation trains with 1,200 prisoners left the station from Binario 21. A Memoriale della Shoah was opened at the former platform in January 2013 to commemorate these events.

It has 24 platforms. Each day about 330,000 passengers use the station, totaling about 120 million per year.

The station has no definite architectural style, but is a blend of many different styles, especially Liberty and Art Deco, but not limited to those. It is adorned with numerous sculptures. "The 'incongruous envelope of stone' (Attilio Pracchi) of this gigantic and monumental building dominates Piazza Duca d'Aosta."

On 25 September 2006 officials announced a €100 million project, already in progress, to refurbish the station. Of the total cost, €20 million has been allocated to restore "certain areas of high artistic value" while the remaining €80 million will be used for more general improvements to the station to make it more functional with the current railway services. The project includes moving the ticket office and installing new elevators and escalators for increased accessibility.

There remain unrestored and inaccessible areas to the public within the station, including a waiting room with swastikas on the floor designed to receive Hitler.

Gallery

Train services
The station has 24 tracks. Every day about 320,000 passengers pass through the station using about 500 trains, for an annual total of 120 million passengers. 
The station is served by national and international routes, with both long-distance and regional lines. Daily international destinations include Basel, Lugano, Geneva, Zürich, Paris, Vienna, Marseille and Munich. The station is also connected to Milan-Malpensa Airport through the Malpensa Express airport train.

The following services call at the station (incomplete):

Domestic (High-speed)
 High-speed train (Trenitalia Frecciarossa) Turin-Salerno: Turin Porta Nuova - Turin Porta Susa - Milano Centrale - Milan Rogoredo - Bologna Centrale - Florence S.M.Novella - Rome Tiburtina - Rome Termini - Naples Centrale - Salerno
 High speed train (Trenitalia Frecciarossa) Milan-Bari: Milan - Bologna - Ancona - Pescara - Foggia – Bari
 High-speed train (Trenitalia Frecciarossa) Milan-Venice: Milan - Brescia - Peschiera del Garda - Verona - Vicenza - Padua - Venice
 High-speed train (Italo NTV) Turin-Salerno: Turin - Milan - Bologna - Florence - Rome - Naples - Salerno
 High-speed train (Trenitalia Frecciabianca) Turin-Venice: Turin - Novara - Milan - Brescia - Verona - Vicenza - Padua - Venice - (Trieste)
 High-speed train (Trenitalia Frecciabianca) Milan-Lecce: Milan - Piacenza - Parma - Reggio d'Emilia - Modena - Bologna - Rimini - Pesaro - Ancona - San Benedetto del Tronto - Pescara - Termoli - Foggia - Bari - Brindisi - Lecce
 High-speed train (Trenitalia Frecciabianca) Milan-Bari/Taranto: Milan - Modena - Bologna - Rimini - Ancona - Pescara - Foggia - Bari - Taranto

Domestic
For regional (Regio) trains to Monza and Como from Milano Centrale, refer to the 'cross-border' services. There is no train service of Milan Suburbano at the Centrale station.
 Airport train (Trenord Malpensa Express) Milan-Malpensa Airport: Milan - (Busto Arsizio) - Malpensa Airport
 Intercity train (Trenitalia Intercity) Milan-Lecce: Milan - Piacenza - Parma - Modena - Bologna - Rimini - Ancona - Pescara - Foggia - Trani - Bari - Fasano - Brindisi - Lecce
 Intercity train (Trenitalia Intercity) Milan-Taranto: Milan - Lodi - Piacenza - Parma - Reggio Emilia - Modena - Bologna - Faenza - Cesena - Rimini - Riccione - Pesaro - Senigalla - Ancona - Giulianova - Pescara - Termoli - Foggia - Trani - Bisceglie - Bari - Taranto
 Intercity train (Trenitalia Intercity) Milan-Livorno: Milan - Pavia - Tortona - Genova Piazza Principe - Genova Brignole  - Santa Margherita Ligure-Portofino - Rapallo - Chiavari - Sestri Levante - Levanto - Monterosso - La Spezia Centrale - Massa Centro - Viareggio - Pisa Centrale - Livorno Centrale
 Intercity train (Trenitalia Intercity) Milan-Ventimiglia: Milan - Pavia - Genova - San Remo - Ventimiglia
 Night train (Trenitalia Intercity Notte) Milan-Lecce: Milan - Piacenza - Parma - Reggio d'Emilia - Modena - Bologna - Cesana - Rimini - Ancona - Pescara - Foggia - Bari - Trani - Brindisi - Lecce
 Regional train (Trenitalia Regionale Veloce) Turin-Milan: Turin - Vercelli - Novara - Milan
 Regional train (Trenitalia Regional) Milan-Alessandria: Milan - Pavia - Voghera - Tortona - Alessandria
 Regional train (Trenord Regio) Milan-Verona: Milan - Brescia - Peschiera del Garda - Verona
 Regional train (Trenord Regio) Milan-Tirano: Milan - Lecco - Sondrio - Tirano
 Regional train (Trenord Regio) Milan-Mantua: Milan - Lodi - Codgono - Cremona - Piadana - Mantova
 Regional train (Trenord Regio) Milan-Bergamo: Milan - Treviglio - Bergamo
 Historic train (Fondazione FS/Trenitalia Storico) Milan-Varallo: Milan - Novara - Varallo Sesia

Cross-border (Night train)

(CH for Switzerland, D for Germany, A for Austria, MN for Monaco)

The following train has been moved to stop at Milano Lambrate railway station and Milano Porta Garibaldi railway station in 2020:

 Night train (ÖBB Nightjet) Milan-Munich/Vienna: Milan - Brescia - Peschiera del Garda - Verona^ - (Rovereto/Rofreit) - (Trento/Trient) - Bolzano/Bozen - (Brennero/Brenner) - Innsbruck (A) - Jenbach (A) - Kufstein (A) - Munich (D)

This train connects at Verona with ÖBB Nightjet/EuroNight Rome-Vienna: the train splits into two parts (first half couples with ÖBB Rome-Vienna and leaves for Vienna or Rome; second half continues to Munich or Milan). Vienna-Rome splits into two trains (first half continues to Rome or Vienna; second half couples with the train for Milan or Munich).

Cross-border

After the opening of Gotthard Base Tunnel in December 2016, train services between Milan and Switzerland increased in frequency. All SBB-CFF-FSS Eurocity now save 35 minutes of total journey time between Bellinzona and Arth-Goldau.

From December 2017, a new cross-border service Milan-Frankfurt (Trenitalia-DB-SBB Eurocity) via Zürich will be operational.

From December 18, 2021, a new service Paris-Milan with Frecciarossa is opened.
 Regional train (TiLo Regio) Milan-Bellinzona: Milan - Monza - Como (San Giovanni) - Chiasso (CH) - Lugano (CH) - Bellinzona (CH)
 Intercity train (Trenitalia-SBB-CFF-FSS EuroCity) Geneva-Milan/Venice: Geneva/Genf (CH) - Lausanne (CH) - Brig (CH) - Domodossola - Milan - (Brescia) - (Verona) - (Padua) - (Venice)
 Intercity train (Trenitalia-SBB-CFF-FSS EuroCity) Basel-Milan: Basel SBB (CH) - Bern/Berne (CH) - Thun (CH) - Brig (CH) - Domodossola - Stresa - Busto Arsizio - Milan
 Intercity train (Trenitalia-SBB-CFF-FSS EuroCity) Zürich-Milan: Zürich (CH) - Zug (CH) - Arth-Goldau (CH) - Bellinzona (CH) - Lugano (CH) - Chiasso (CH) - Como (San Giovanni) - Monza - Milan
 Intercity train (Trenitalia-SBB-CFF-FSS EuroCity) Luzern-Milan: Luzern (CH) - Arth-Goldau (CH) - Bellinzona (CH) - Lugano (CH) - Chiasso (CH) - Como (San Giovanni) - Monza - Milan

Platforms

The station, along with Roma Termini and Firenze Santa Maria Novella, has security gates which prevent access to the platforms without a ticket.

Each platform is usually dedicated to some particular route. The current organization is as follows, although temporary changes may occur.
 Platforms 1-3: Chiasso/Domodossola/Milan-Turin (ES* AV)
 Platforms 4-6: Turin/Cisalpino Milan–Como–Arth Goldau–Basel / Zürich
 Platforms 7-13: Venice / Udine
 Platforms 14-17: Bologna–Florence–Rome–Naples
 Platforms 18-23: Genoa-Livorno / Ventimiglia / Parma / Cremona-Mantua / Milan-Treviglio-Bergamo
 Platform 24: Operations

Unusual track layout
On the northern side of the railway yard there used to be a loop curve so that trains could turn around and reverse back into the station. The trains could so be displaced from the left side of the station to the right side and vice versa without crossing all the tracks. The tracks on the loop curve are partially broken up.

Images

See also

History of rail transport in Italy
List of railway stations in Lombardy
Rail transport in Italy
Railway stations in Milan
Railway stations in Italy

References

External links

 Official website at Grandistazioni website
 Illustrated contemporary description of the station

Art Nouveau architecture in Milan
Art Nouveau railway stations
Centrale
Railway stations opened in 1931
1931 establishments in Italy
Railway stations in Italy opened in the 20th century